Bard-e Gazhdi (also Romanized as Bard-e Gazhdī) is a village in Hati Rural District, Hati District, Lali County, Khuzestan Province, Iran. At the 2006 census, its population was 97, in 19 families.

References 

Populated places in Lali County